There are 101 listed buildings (Swedish: byggnadsminne) in Gävleborg County.

Bollnäs Municipality

Gävle Municipality

Hofors Municipality

Hudiksvall Municipality

Ljusdal Municipality

Nordanstig Municipality

Ockelbo Municipality

Ovanåker Municipality

Sandviken Municipality

Söderhamn Municipality

External links

  Bebyggelseregistret

Listed buildings in Sweden
Buildings and structures in Gävleborg County